Vito Wormgoor (born 16 November 1988) is a Dutch footballer.

Career

Wormgoor has played for various youth clubs. In 2006, he moved to AFC Ajax where he was a reserve defensive player for two seasons. On 2 September 2008 he moved to FC Utrecht and made his debut against FC Groningen on 14 September 2008. In the 2008–09 season he played seven games and scored no goals. In mid-2012 he signed with ADO Den Haag.

On 18 December 2019 Wormgoor was signed to Columbus Crew SC. Wormgoor suffered a long-term injury early in the season that kept him out for the duration of Columbus's season, however, he was part of the squad that won the 2020 MLS Cup. Following the 2021 season, Columbus opted to decline their contract option on Wormgoor.

Career statistics

Club

Honours

Club
De Graafschap
Eerste Divisie: 2009–10

Columbus Crew

 MLS Cup (1): 2020
Campeones Cup (1): 2021

Personal life
His younger brother Nando Wormgoor is also a footballer.

References

External links
 Vito Wormgoor at Voetbal International 
 
 Vito Wormgoor Interview

1988 births
Living people
Dutch footballers
Netherlands youth international footballers
Dutch expatriate footballers
FC Utrecht players
De Graafschap players
ADO Den Haag players
Aalesunds FK players
SK Brann players
Columbus Crew players
Eredivisie players
Eerste Divisie players
Eliteserien players
People from Leersum
Expatriate footballers in Norway
Dutch expatriate sportspeople in Norway
Association football defenders
Major League Soccer players
VV DOVO players
Footballers from Utrecht (province)
Dutch expatriate sportspeople in the United States
Expatriate soccer players in the United States
IK Start players